Sgt. Emma Firyana Saroji  (born 21 October 1986) is a Malaysian lawn bowler.

Biography

World Championships
In 2020, she was selected for the 2020 World Outdoor Bowls Championship in Australia.

Commonwealth Games
Emma competed in both the women's triples and women's fours events at the 2014 Commonwealth Games. She failed to qualify from the group stages in the women's triples event but won a silver medal in the women's fours

In 2018, she was selected as part of the Malaysian team for the 2018 Commonwealth Games on the Gold Coast in Queensland where she claimed a gold medal in the Pairs with Siti Zalina Ahmad.

In 2022, she competed in the women's pairs and the Women's fours at the 2022 Commonwealth Games.

Other events
In 2015 she won the World Singles Champion of Champions in Brisbane, defeating Nicolene Neal in the final.

She also won two medals at the 2015 Asia Pacific Bowls Championships in Christchurch and has won three gold medals in the Lawn bowls at the Southeast Asian Games.

Awards and accolades
 Darjah Kebesaran Ahli Kegemilangan Sukan Selangor (AKS) (2018)

References

1986 births
Living people
Bowls players at the 2014 Commonwealth Games
Bowls players at the 2018 Commonwealth Games
Bowls players at the 2022 Commonwealth Games
Commonwealth Games medallists in lawn bowls
Commonwealth Games silver medallists for Malaysia
Malaysian female bowls players
Southeast Asian Games medalists in lawn bowls
Southeast Asian Games gold medalists for Malaysia
Competitors at the 2007 Southeast Asian Games
Competitors at the 2017 Southeast Asian Games
Competitors at the 2019 Southeast Asian Games
20th-century Malaysian women
21st-century Malaysian women
Medallists at the 2014 Commonwealth Games
Medallists at the 2018 Commonwealth Games